Cinkassé is a prefecture located in the Savanes Region of Togo. The cantons (or subdivisions) of Cinkassé include Cinkassé, Biankouri, Timbou, Nadjoundi, Boadé, Samnaba, Noaga, Gouloungoussi.

In the far northwest of Kpendjal is a long, thin strip along the border with Burkina Faso that includes Togo's farthest north and farthest west points.  In this area is also Togo's only border with the Boulgou Province of Burkina Faso.

References 

Prefectures of Togo